Tjessem is a Norwegian surname. Notable people with the surname include:

Charles Tjessem (born 1971), Norwegian chef
Mette-Marit Tjessem Høiby, titled Mette-Marit, Crown Princess of Norway

See also
Tessem

Norwegian-language surnames